The 18th Central Politburo of the Chinese Communist Party was elected by the 18th Central Committee of the Chinese Communist Party (CCP) on 15 November 2012, which was formally elected by the 18th National Congress of the Chinese Communist Party. It was nominally preceded by the 17th Politburo. It was succeeded by the 19th Politburo of the Chinese Communist Party.

Explanation on composition
At the beginning of its term, the 25 Politburo members held the following portfolios: seven members of the CCP Politburo Standing Committee, six regional party leaders, two military figures, five leaders of central party organs and commissions, three Vice Premiers, the Vice President, and the head of the national trade union federation. The internal composition was largely similar to the previous Politburo, with only a few portfolio changes.

The number of Standing Committee members decreased from nine to seven. The party leaders of the direct-controlled municipalities of Beijing, Shanghai, Tianjin, and Chongqing, the province of Guangdong, and the far western region of Xinjiang were represented on the Politburo; this arrangement was unchanged from the previous Politburo.  The two vice-chairmen of the Central Military Commission, the national trade union head, the head of the party's Organization and Propaganda departments, and all Vice-Premiers were represented on the Politburo; again this arrangement was totally consistent with the composition of the previous Politburo.

The long-term head of the Policy Research Office, Wang Huning, gained a seat on the Politburo. This was the first time the head of this office was represented at the Politburo level. Prior to the start of his Politburo term, Wang sat on the Central Secretariat. Similarly, Li Zhanshu, who was appointed director of the party's General Office, was also given a seat on the Politburo, while his predecessors generally did not enjoy this 'privilege'. The Secretary of the Central Political and Legal Affairs Commission, Meng Jianzhu, did not earn a seat on the Standing Committee, unlike his predecessor Zhou Yongkang.

Moreover, no Politburo member directly took on the role that Li Changchun played as "propaganda chief" in the previous Politburo; instead, Standing Committee member Liu Yunshan was named both executive Secretary of the Secretariat in charge of party affairs, he was also seen as having 'taken over' Li Changchun's post as informal "propaganda chief". Liu Yandong, who continued her term from the 17th Politburo, was promoted from State Councilor to Vice-Premier; therefore no State Councilors sat on the 18th Politburo.

Apart from the seven Standing Committee members, only three others maintained their membership from the previous Politburo: Liu Yandong, Li Yuanchao, and Wang Yang, meaning that 15 out of the 25 members were newcomers. Li held the office of vice-president, which was previously held by Xi Jinping, and Wang was transferred from his post as Guangdong party secretary to become Vice Premier. Li and Wang theoretically meet the age requirements to advance one level higher to the Standing Committee at the 19th Party Congress, the only two-term Politburo members apart from Xi Jinping and Li Keqiang who met this requirement.

Two women, Sun Chunlan and Liu Yandong, sat on the Politburo, the first time this has happened since 1973 (when Ye Qun and Jiang Qing were part of the Politburo). No ethnic minorities earned a seat on the council.

Changes during term
When Ling Jihua was removed from office as the head of the United Front Work Department due to a corruption investigation in December 2014, Sun Chunlan left her post as party secretary of Tianjin to take lead of the United Front Department. This meant that Tianjin temporarily lost its representation on the Politburo. Conversely, it also made Sun the first United Front Department head to sit on the Politburo in decades. In September 2016, Zhang Chunxian was transferred out of Xinjiang to become the deputy leader of the Leading Group for Party Building. Guo Jinlong retired from his post as party secretary of Beijing in May 2017 to become Vice Chairman of the Central Guidance Commission on Building Spiritual Civilization. Sun Zhengcai was placed under investigation by the Central Commission for Discipline Inspection in July 2017 and therefore was removed from office as party secretary of Chongqing.

Members 
 In stroke order of surnames:
 Xi Jinping, General Secretary of the Chinese Communist Party, Chairman of the Central Military Commission, President of China, 1st-ranked member of Politburo Standing Committee,
 Ma Kai, Vice Premier
 Wang Qishan, 6th-ranked member of Politburo Standing Committee, Secretary of the Central Commission for Discipline Inspection
 Wang Huning, Director of the Policy Research Office of the CCP Central Committee
 Liu Yunshan, 5th-ranked member of Politburo Standing Committee, Top-ranked Secretary of the CCP Central Secretariat, Chairman of the Central Guidance Commission for Building Spiritual Civilization, President of the Central Party School
 Liu Yandong, Vice Premier
 Liu Qibao, Secretary of the CCP Central Secretariat, Head of the CCP Propaganda Department
 Xu Qiliang, Vice Chairman of the Central Military Commission
 Sun Chunlan, party secretary of Tianjin (until 2014); head of the CCP United Front Work Department
 Sun Zhengcai, Party secretary of Chongqing (until 2017; expelled)
 Li Keqiang, 2nd-ranked member of Politburo Standing Committee, Premier of the People's Republic of China
 Li Jianguo, Vice-chairman and Secretary-General of the Standing Committee of the National People's Congress
 Li Yuanchao, Vice President of the People's Republic of China
 Wang Yang, Vice Premier
 Zhang Chunxian, Party secretary of Xinjiang (until 2016); deputy leader, Leading Group for Party Building
 Zhang Gaoli, 7th-ranked member of Politburo Standing Committee, First-ranked Vice Premier
 Zhang Dejiang, 3rd-ranked member of Politburo Standing Committee, Chairman of the Standing Committee of the National People's Congress
 Fan Changlong, Vice Chairman of the Central Military Commission
 Meng Jianzhu, Head of the Central Politics and Law Commission
 Zhao Leji, Secretary of the CCP Central Secretariat, Head of the Organization Department of the CCP Central Committee. 
 Hu Chunhua, Party secretary of Guangdong
 Yu Zhengsheng, 4th-ranked member of Politburo Standing Committee and Chairman of the National Committee of the Chinese People's Political Consultative Conference
 Li Zhanshu, Secretary of CCP Central Secretariat, Chief of the General Office of the Chinese Communist Party
 Guo Jinlong, Party secretary of Beijing (until 2017); Vice Chairman, Central Guidance Commission on Building Spiritual Civilization
 Han Zheng, Party secretary of Shanghai

Standing Committee members 

 Ordered in political position ranking 
 Xi Jinping (General Secretary)
 Li Keqiang
 Zhang Dejiang
 Yu Zhengsheng
 Liu Yunshan
 Wang Qishan
 Zhang Gaoli

References

External links 
  18th CCP Central Committee

Politburo of the Chinese Communist Party
2012 establishments in China
2017 disestablishments in China
Xi Jinping
Li Keqiang